The Diving competition in the 2001 Summer Universiade were held in Beijing, People's Republic of China.

Medal overview

Men's events

Women's events

Medal table

References
 

2001 Summer Universiade
U
Diving at the Summer Universiade